Choi Ju-yeon (born 19 November 1975) is a South Korean former tennis player, who competed on the professional tour in the 1990s.

Biography
Born in Busan, she reached a career-high of 176 in the world for singles, winning 12 ITF titles. She made the main draw of the WTA Tour tournament at Beijing in 1995, where she was beaten in the first round by Tessa Price in three sets.

As a doubles player, she won three medals for South Korea in the Asian Games. At the 1994 Asian Games in Hiroshima, she won bronze medals in both the women's doubles and mixed doubles events. In Bangkok four years later, she was a silver medalist in the mixed doubles, partnering Kim Dong-hyun.

Choi represented the South Korea Fed Cup team in 14 ties, which included a World Group fixture against France in 1994.

ITF finals

Singles (12–5)

Doubles (7–4)

References

External links
 
 
 

1975 births
Living people
South Korean female tennis players
Sportspeople from Busan
Tennis players at the 1994 Asian Games
Tennis players at the 1998 Asian Games
Medalists at the 1994 Asian Games
Medalists at the 1998 Asian Games
Asian Games silver medalists for South Korea
Asian Games bronze medalists for South Korea
Asian Games medalists in tennis
20th-century South Korean women
21st-century South Korean women